West Davenport is a hamlet in Delaware County, New York, United States. West Davenport has a post office with ZIP code 13860, which opened on January 25, 1839.

References

Hamlets in Delaware County, New York
Hamlets in New York (state)